Negative gearing in Australia deals with the laws in the Australian income tax system relating to net loss suffered by a taxpayer on their investment property, commonly called negative gearing. Negative gearing can arise in a number of contexts; for example, with real estate investments, it arises when the net rental income is less than the mortgage loan interest payable, and with shares, when net dividend income is less than the interest payable on a margin loan.

General
For income tax purposes, Australia allows the offsetting of property losses against other types of income, such as wage or business income, with only a few limits or restrictions. Negative gearing by property investors reduced personal income tax revenue in Australia by $600 million in the 2001/02 tax year, $3.9 billion in 2004/05, and $13.2 billion in 2010/11.

Negative gearing continues to be a controversial political issue in Australia and was a major issue during the 2016 and 2019 Australian federal elections, during which the Australian Labor Party proposed restricting but not eliminating negative gearing and to halve the capital gains tax discount to 25%. An analysis found that negative gearing in Australia provides a greater benefit to wealthier Australians than the less wealthy according to a report from the Grattan Institute.

Federal Treasurer at the time, Scott Morrison, in defense of negative gearing, cited tax data that showed that numerous middle-income groups (he mentioned teachers, nurses, and electricians) benefit in larger numbers from negative gearing than finance managers.

History
Traditionally, Australian taxpayers have been allowed to negatively gear their investment properties, in the strict sense of investing in property at an initial loss. Negative gearing was restricted by a prohibition on the transfer of contingent property income and the property losses could not offset income from labour. It is assumed this applied to losses as well as income, but this is unclear in the Income Tax Assessment Act 1936.

In 1983, the Victorian Deputy Commissioner of Taxation briefly denied Victorian property investors the deduction for interest in excess of the rental income, so losses could not be transferred nor moved to a future tax year. That ruling was quickly overruled by the federal tax commissioner.

The Hawke government's reversion to the earlier system in which property losses could not offset income from labour was unpopular with property investors. These investors claimed this reversion had caused investment in rental accommodation to dry up and rents to rise substantially. This was unsupported by evidence other than localised increases in real rents in both Perth and Sydney, which also had the lowest vacancy rates of all capital cities at the time.

Taxation
In general, an investor can claim the loss on holding an investment property, reducing the investor's total taxable income accordingly. On the other hand, in some contexts, the investment losses are ignored, such as in the case of determining the thresholds for the Medicare levy surcharge, the private health insurance rebate, and in calculating the HELP Repayment Income, as well as other Centrelink income-tested allowances and benefits.

In addition to the tax benefits of negative gearing, the investor typically would take into account the anticipated increase in the market value of the property and the tax treatment of capital gains under Australian law. For example, if the investor has held an investment property for more than twelve months, then only 50% of the capital gain is taxable.

Arguments for and against
It's true, according to Real Estate Institute data, that rents went up in Sydney and Perth. But the same data doesn't show any discernible increase in the other state capitals. I would say that, if negative gearing had been responsible for a surge in rents, then you should have observed it everywhere, not just two capitals. In fact, if you dig into other parts of the REI database, what you find is that vacancy rates were unusually low at that time before negative gearing was abolished.Eslake is referring to changes in inflation-adjusted rents (i.e., when CPI inflation is subtracted from the nominal rent increases). These are also known as real rent changes. Nominal rents nationally rose by over 25% during the two years that negative gearing was quarantined. They rose strongly in every Australian capital city, according to the official ABS CPI data. However, as nominal changes include inflation, they provide a less clear picture of how rents changed in effect, and how changes, such as disallowing property losses to offset other types of income, affect rent.

Effect on housing affordability

In 2003, the Reserve Bank of Australia (RBA) stated in its submission to the Productivity Commission First Home Ownership Inquiry:

there are no specific aspects of current tax arrangements designed to encourage investment in property relative to other investments in the Australian tax system. Nor is there any recent tax policy initiative we can point to that accounts for the rapid growth in geared property investment. But the fact is that when we observe the results, resources and finance are being disproportionately channelled into this area, and property promoters use tax effectiveness as an important selling point.

They went on to say that "the most sensible area to look for moderation of demand is among investors", and that:

the taxation treatment in Australia is more favourable to investors than is the case in other countries. In particular, the following areas appear worthy of further study by the Productivity Commission:
i. ability to negatively gear an investment property when there is little prospect of the property being cash-flow positive for many years;
ii. the benefit that investors receive by virtue of the fact that when property depreciation allowances are "clawed back" through the capital gains tax, the rate of tax is lower than the rate that applied when depreciation was allowed in the first place.
iii. the general treatment of property depreciation, including the ability to claim depreciation on loss-making investments.

In 2008, the report of the Senate Select Committee on Housing Affordability in Australia echoed the findings of the 2004 Productivity Commission report. One recommendation to the enquiry suggested that negative gearing should be capped: "There should not be unlimited access. Millionaires and billionaires should not be able to access it, and you should not be able to access it on your 20th investment property. There should be limits to it."

A 2015 report from the Senate Economics References Committee argues that, while negative gearing influences housing affordability, the primary issue is a mismatch between supply and demand.

Politics and economics
Negative gearing continues to be a controversial political issue in Australia and was a major issue during the 2016 Australian federal election and the 2019 Australian federal election, during which the Australian Labor Party proposed to eliminate the tax-deductibility of negative gearing losses against non-investment income (with some exceptions) and to halve the capital gains tax discount to 25%. An analysis found that negative gearing in Australia provides a greater benefit to wealthier Australians than the less wealthy.

See also
 Taxation in Australia

References

Income tax in Australia
Taxation in Australia